The Westerlichttoren or West Schouwen is a lighthouse in Haamstede, Netherlands. Designed by L. Valk, it was built in 1837. At 47 m above ground and a light stand at 58 m above sea level it is one of the tallest lighthouses in the Netherlands.

The lighthouse is built in brick and iron, the walls are 2.4 m thick at the bottom, tapering upward. It is painted in a red-and-white spiral. A stair of 226 steps, in stone and partially in iron, leads to the top. The lighthouse is unattended.

Light
The lighthouse is switched on and off automatically by a light sensor. A sailor can recognise the light by its characteristic: group flash 2+1. The current lenses were installed in 1953.  Originally the light was an incandescent light bulb of 4200 W, which has been replaced by a 2000 W gas-discharge lamp.

Notability
This lighthouse was well known by the public as it was used for the former 250 Dutch guilder note designed by Ootje Oxenaar.

See also

 List of lighthouses in the Netherlands

References

Lighthouses in the Netherlands
Lighthouses completed in 1837
Towers in Zeeland
Rijksmonuments in Zeeland
Buildings and structures in Schouwen-Duiveland
History of Schouwen-Duiveland